Aldie may refer to:
 Hill of Aldie, Aberdeenshire, Scotland
 Aldie, Virginia, United States
 Aldie, Highland, Scotland
 Aldie Castle, a Category A listed building in Perth and Kinross, Scotland

See also

 Aldi, a supermarket chain based in Germany